The Pacific Ladies Classic was a golf tournament on the LPGA Tour from 1962 to 1968.
It was played in Eugene, Oregon at the Eugene Country Club every year except 1967 when it was played at the Shadow Hills Country Club.

Winners
Pacific Ladies Classic
1968 Sandra Haynie

Pacific Golf Classic
1967 Clifford Ann Creed

Pacific Ladies' Classic
1966 Mickey Wright

Eugene Open
1965 Mary Mills

Eugene Ladies' Open
1964 Mary Mills
1963 Marilynn Smith

Eugene Open
1962 Shirley Englehorn

References

Former LPGA Tour events
Golf in Oregon
Sports in Eugene, Oregon
Sports competitions in Oregon
Annual events in Oregon
Recurring sporting events established in 1962
Recurring events disestablished in 1968
1962 establishments in Oregon
1968 disestablishments in Oregon
History of women in Oregon
Women's sports in Oregon